Tight Rope is the sixth studio album by American country music duo Brooks & Dunn, released in 1999 on Arista Nashville. Their least successful album commercially, it was the first album of their career not to receive platinum certification from the RIAA; furthermore, only one of its three singles reached the top ten on the country charts. The album's lead single was a cover of John Waite's 1984 number-one pop hit "Missing You". This cover peaked at No. 15 on the Hot Country Songs chart. Following it were "Beer Thirty" (No. 19) and "You'll Always Be Loved by Me" (No. 5). "Goin' Under Gettin' Over You" reached No. 60 from unsolicited play as an album cut.

Track listing

Charts

Weekly charts

Year-end charts

Personnel

Brooks & Dunn
Kix Brooks - lead vocals, background vocals
Ronnie Dunn - lead vocals, background vocals

Musicians
Robert Bailey - background vocals
Bruce Bouton - lap steel guitar, pedal steel guitar
Mike Brignardello - bass guitar
Larry Byrom - acoustic guitar
Mark Casstevens - acoustic guitar
Kim Fleming - background vocals
Larry Franklin - fiddle
Paul Franklin - pedal steel guitar, lap steel guitar
Rob Hajacos - fiddle, "assorted hoedown tools"
Vicki Hampton - background vocals
Aubrey Haynie - fiddle
John Barlow Jarvis - piano, keyboards, Hammond B-3 organ
B. James Lowry - electric guitar
Brent Mason - electric guitar
Steve Nathan - keyboards
John Wesley Ryles - background vocals
Dennis Wilson - background vocals
Lonnie Wilson - drums, percussion
Glenn Worf - bass guitar
Curtis Young - background vocals

Production
 Kix Brooks, Ronnie Dunn, Don Cook (tracks 3, 5, 8, 10, 12, 13)
 Kix Brooks, Ronnie Dunn, Byron Gallimore (tracks 1, 2, 4, 6, 7, 9, 11)
 Doug Sax - Mastering

References

1999 albums
Brooks & Dunn albums
Arista Records albums
Albums produced by Don Cook
Albums produced by Byron Gallimore